Odontomyia angulata,  also called the orange-horned green colonel, is a European species of soldier fly.

Distribution
Afghanistan, Albania, Algeria, Austria, Belgium, Bulgaria, China, Czech Republic, Denmark, Egypt, England, Estonia, Finland, France, Germany, Greece, Hungary, Iran, Israel, Italy, Kazakhstan, Morocco, Netherlands, Poland, Romania, Russia.

References

Stratiomyidae
Diptera of Europe
Diptera of Africa
Diptera of Asia
Insects described in 1798
Taxa named by Georg Wolfgang Franz Panzer